The River Torridge is a river in Devon in England; it rises near Meddon. The river describes a long loop through Devon farming country where its tributaries the Lew and Okement join before meeting the Taw at Appledore and flowing into the Bristol Channel. The river is spate dependent and often flows between wooded banks which can be steep. The Torridge local government district is named after the river.

It was the home of Tarka the Otter in Henry Williamson's book.

Route
The river rises close to the border with Cornwall (north of the source of the River Tamar). Its two primary sources are Seckington Water, which rises near Baxworthy Cross, and Clifford Water, the longer of the two, which rises alongside the A39 at Higher Clovelly. These run south and join to form the Torridge at Huddisford. It then flows generally east, passing between East Putford and West Putford, and near Bradford it is joined by the River Waldon, then heads east past Black Torrington and Sheepwash.  It is joined by the River Lew near Hatherleigh,  and then by the River Okement near Meeth.

It then flows northwards, picking up the River Mere south of Beaford.  After this it makes tight bends, and goes past Little Torrington and Great Torrington heading generally north-west.  It is joined by the River Yeo at Pillmouth, and then becomes estuarine by Bideford. Between Appledore and Instow it joins the estuary of the River Taw and enters Bideford Bay.

The Tarka Trail walking and cycle route partly follows the course of the North Devon Railway, which, for a considerable distance, closely followed the line of the river.  South of Bideford the railway crossed from one bank to the other, and the Trail provides a good vantage point for viewing the river.

List of bridges

The following is a list of bridges over the River Torridge listed going upstream from the estuary at Bideford:
Torridge A39 Road Bridge
Bideford Long Bridge
Halfpenny Bridge, Annery/ Weare Giffard 
Beam Aqueduct, (Rolle Canal), Beam, Great Torrington
Rothern Bridge, Great Torrington
Rolle Bridge, Great Torrington
Taddiport Bridge, Great Torrington
New Bridge, Great Torrington
 Iron Bridge, Landcross, Bideford

References

Sources

Torridge
Estuaries of England